
Gmina Nekla is an urban-rural gmina (administrative district) in Września County, Greater Poland Voivodeship, in west-central Poland.

Villages
Apart from the town of Nekla, Gmina Nekla contains the villages and settlements of Barczyzna, Chwałszyce, Gąsiorowo, Gierłatowo, Kokoszki, Mała Górka, Mystki, Nekielka, Opatówko, Podstolice, Racławki, Rajmundowo, Starczanowo, Stępocin, Stroszki, Targowa Górka and Zasutowo.

Neighbouring gminas
Gmina Nekla is bordered by the gminas of Czerniejewo, Dominowo, Kostrzyn, Pobiedziska and Września.

References
Polish official population figures 2006

 
Nekla